John Wesley Martin (28 July 1931 – 15 July 1992) was an Australian cricketer who played in eight Test matches from 1960 to 1967.

References

1931 births
1992 deaths
Australia Test cricketers
New South Wales cricketers
South Australia cricketers
International Cavaliers cricketers
Australian cricketers
Cricketers from New South Wales
People from the Mid North Coast